Leah Lax is an American author and librettist. She is best known for her memoir Uncovered: How I Left Hasidic Life and Finally Came Home which was later created as an opera with composer Lori Laitman.

Biography 
Lax was born in 1956 in Dallas, Texas. She joined the Lubavitcher Hasidim at sixteen. In 1975, Lax entered an arranged marriage at the age of 19, and remained among the Hasidim for thirty years, bearing seven children. In 2002 she left the community to lead a secular life and live openly as a lesbian. Subsequently, Lax graduated from the University of Houston with an MFA in Creative Writing. She had completed her undergraduate studies at the University of Texas at Austin.

Career 
Lax started writing in earnest after she underwent a secret abortion to terminate a life-threatening pregnancy. In 2007 Lax co-wrote The Refuge for the Houston Grand Opera with composer Christopher Theofanidis debuted at Houston's Wortham Center. In 2013, she created and designed Houston's In Concert Against Hate for the Houston Symphony In collaboration with the Anti-Defamation League, In 2020, Lax created an opera Uncovered  with composer Lori Laitman and director/dramatist Beth Greenberg. Lax wrote the libretto based on her memoir Uncovered: How I Left Hasidic Life and Finally Came Home, narrating thirty years as a Hasidic wife, mother, and closeted lesbian.

Uncovered was named Redbook Magazine's "Best of 2015".

References 

1956 births
Living people
American women memoirists
Writers from Dallas
21st-century American memoirists
Jewish American writers
21st-century American women writers
American lesbian writers
Former Orthodox Jews
Lesbian memoirists
LGBT people from Texas
American librettists
Women librettists
University of Houston alumni
American Hasidim
University of Texas at Austin alumni